Jamarius Burton (born April 15, 2000) is an American college basketball player for the Pittsburgh Panthers of the Atlantic Coast Conference (ACC). He previously played for Wichita State and Texas Tech.

Burton was born in Champaign, Illinois and his family moved to Charlotte, North Carolina, where Burton starred at Independence High School before suffering an ACL injury. After recovering from his injury, he committed to Wichita State and spent his first two college seasons playing for the Shockers. Burton played two seasons at Wichita State, averaging 7.3 points, 3.4 rebounds and 3.4 assists per game. He the transferred to Texas Tech for the 2020–21 season. Burton played one season for the Red Raiders, averaging 4.3 points per game. Following the departure of his coach, Chris Beard, Burton re-entered the transfer portal.

Burton landed at Pittsburgh where, in his first season with the Panthers in 2021–22, he suffered a knee injury causing him to miss the start of the season. He averaged 12.4 points, 3.5 rebounds and 2.4 assists per game. In his second season, Burton emerged as one of the top players in the conference.

References

External links
Pittsburgh Panthers bio
Texas Tech Red Raiders bio
Wichita State Shockers bio

2000 births
Living people
American men's basketball players
Basketball players from Charlotte, North Carolina
Basketball players from Illinois
Pittsburgh Panthers men's basketball players
Shooting guards
Sportspeople from Champaign, Illinois
Texas Tech Red Raiders basketball players
Wichita State Shockers men's basketball players